Wilsthorpe School (formerly Wilsthorpe Community School) is a co-educational secondary school and sixth form located in Long Eaton, Derbyshire, England.

History
It opened in 1954 as the Wilsthorpe Secondary Modern School. Neighbouring the school was the Parklands County Secondary Modern School, which became an infants school. During the Eighties it was known as Wilsthorpe Community School.

The school gained Business and Enterprise specialist school status in 2005.

The secondary school shares its site with Parklands Infants School and Harrington Junior School, enabling children to stay on the same site from their first year of school all the way to the Sixth Form of approximately 140 students. Also on the same site are Brackenfield Special School and English Martyrs RC Junior School.

Following its gaining Business and Enterprise status, the school used its capital grant to fund a separate building which was named The Enterprise Centre. In 2009 this was extensively refitted as a state-of-the-art teaching facility for 'catering'.

In July 2017, work began on the building of an entire new school building, behind the existing school buildings. The current Sports Hall will remain (with a gymnasium in the new building) as will the Enterprise Centre and the current Sixth Form building, which will be repurposed. It is hoped that the new building will be available for staff and students to move into in September 2018. After that, the existing school buildings will be demolished and the area landscaped.

The school now has proven strength in all academic areas, according to OFSTED. In addition it is strong in Sports and Drama, both of which are well catered for in the new building. In recent years Wilsthorpe has developed a strength in the production of stage shows which have included Little Shop of Horrors, Singin' in the Rain, Fame!, Hairspray, Grease, The Sound of Music and, in 2017, Les Misérables. The show currently in rehearsal for February 2018 is West Side Story. There are also secondary productions including A Midsummer Night's Dream (2016) which was also performed at the RSC's Other Place in Stratford-on-Avon.

Previously a community school administered by Derbyshire County Council, in December 2018 Wilsthorpe Community School converted to academy status and was renamed Wilsthorpe School. The school is now sponsored by The Two Counties Trust.

Film
The school was involved in the filming of Shane Meadows' film This Is England in 2005. The school is the location for the opening/fight sequence in the film.

Leadership and facilities
The headteacher, appointed in 2008, is Jonathan Crofts, a former teacher at the school, who was Deputy Headteacher at Chellaston School prior to the appointment.

The school has a floodlit astro-turf pitch, named the Bainbridge Astro in memory of a former Head of Sport and Recreation, John Bainbridge.

The Enterprise Centre was opened by Peregrine Cavendish, 12th Duke of Devonshire, in May 2008.

Academic performance
As of 2021, the most recent available school performance data are from the 2018/19 year, before the school became an academy. The school's Progress 8 score was average. The proportion of pupils entering the English Baccalaureate was above average, at 50% compared to the local authority average of 35%. The proportion of pupils achieving grade 5 or above in English and maths GCSEs was 45%, similar to the local authority average of 44%. The Attainment 8 score was just below average.

Notable former staff and pupils
 Sir Brian Smedley, Judge, taught here briefly in 1957
 Allan Baker, Wilsthorpe's head, was awarded a CBE in the 1977 Queen's Birthday honours for "services to education".
 Lucy Kite, TV presenter
 Mark Draper, former professional footballer (Aston Villa, Southampton, England U-21)
 Lewis McGugan, professional footballer (currently with Sheffield Wednesday)
 Dan Wheeldon, cricketer
 Saira Khan, TV Personality

References

Secondary schools in Derbyshire
Long Eaton
Educational institutions established in 1954
1954 establishments in England
Academies in Derbyshire